Olaus (Olov) Svebilius (1 January 1624 – 29 June 1700) was a Swedish priest and professor.
He was  Bishop of the Diocese of Linköping and Archbishop of Uppsala.
His most notable work was Martin Luthers Lilla katekes med Katekesförklaring, a Swedish language translation and explanation of Luther's Small Catechism.

Biography
He was born in  Ljungby parish in  Kalmar, Sweden. He was the son of  Jöran Ericsson Swebilius  (1589–1669)  and Ingeborg Larsdotter (1596–1672).  His father served as  crown commander (Kronobefallningsman) at  Södra Möre,  now part of Kalmar municipality. The surname Svebilius was derived from his grandfather's farm Sveby in Sillerud parish (Sveby gård i Sillerud) in Värmland.

He studied at  University of Uppsala in 1638, two years later he enrolled in Königsberg University, and thereafter moved back to Uppsala  earning his Master of Philosophy in 1649. He subsequently conducted study trips to Strasbourg and Paris where he studied law.
Appointed associate professor in Kalmar in 1652, he became rector and associate professor of philosophy in 1656, ordained priest in 1658, became associate professor of theology that same year and vicar of Ljungby in Kalmar diocese in 1663. He subsequently transferred to a theology professorship at Lund University. 

He was appointed court chaplain in 1668,  in 1670 was entrusted with the teachings theology to future King Charles XI of Sweden (1655–1697)  
and in  1671 became Pastor primarius at Storkyrkan church in Stockholm.
After his coronation in 1675, King Charles declared it obligatory for all commoners to learn to read Luther's Small Catechism as translated  by Olov Svebilius. In 1678, Svebilius became Bishop of the Diocese of Linköping and in 1681 Archbishop of Uppsala.
He was the Speaker of the Clergy in the Riksdag between 1682 and 1697.

Personal life
In 1658, he married Elisabeth Gyllenadler (1639–1680), daughter of Samuel Enander (1607–1670) who was Bishop of the Diocese of Linköping (1655–1670).

His children were ennobled Adlerberg and introduced at the House of Nobility. A branch of the family were elevated to counts by the Czar of Russia and thus part of the Russian nobility.

See also 
 List of Archbishops of Uppsala

References

External links
Martin Luthers Lilla katekes med Katekesförklaring

1624 births
1700 deaths
People from Kalmar Municipality
Uppsala University alumni
Academic staff of Lund University
Lutheran archbishops of Uppsala
Lutheran bishops of Linköping
17th-century Lutheran archbishops
17th-century Swedish people